Manhattan Mini Storage is a Manhattan-based self storage company in New York City, United States. Founded in 1978, the company serves New York neighborhoods from 17 storage locations. The company prides itself on its creative marketing efforts and charitable giving. Manhattan Mini Storage was acquired by StorageMart in December 2021.

Operations
Manhattan Mini Storage is the largest personal storage company in New York, and one of the largest in the United States. The firm has 17 storage locations throughout the city, open most every day of the year and some of which are open 24 hours per day. Manhattan Mini Storage has approximately 250,000 clients. Facilities include high-tech security system, free concierge and onsite managers. 

Facilities include high-tech security systems, raised loading bays that are dock-high, heated and fully climate controlled units at most locations, and onsite managers. The firm conducts blind auctions of the belongings of customers who fail to pay their storage bills.

Marketing 
Manhattan Mini Storage prides itself on "identifying what matters to New Yorkers," and markets itself as "an extension of your home where you can keep the things you want to keep but can't quite accommodate in your tight Manhattan apartment." The company creates all its own advertisements, then advertises on billboards and phone booths across Manhattan. Some of the taglines used include, "Your closet's scarier than Bush's agenda," "Your closet is so narrow it makes Cheney look liberal," as well as "We have more wiggle room than Herman Cain's morals."

Manhattan Mini Storage's 2011 Ad campaign, led by Archie Gottesman, included topical and New York City-centric billboards such as "Michele Bachmann says God told her to run for President. How come God never talks to smart people anymore?" "Remember if you leave the city, you'll have to live in America," "Why leave a city that has six professional sports teams, and also the Mets?" and "If you don't like gay marriage, don't get gay married" (released prior to the passage of the Marriage Equality Act in New York State). The company's gay marriage ad was also accompanied by a promotion aimed at gay newlyweds after the Marriage Equality act was passed in July 2011. Adweek's Tim Nudd writes about the 2011 campaign in a March post: "Remember, if you leave the city, you'll have to live in America" — one of most quintessential New York headlines you'll ever see." The company has also had other pro-LGBT advertisement campaigns, including an "If you don't like gay marriage, don't get gay married" campaign in 2013.

Some advertisements have been controversial. In 2007, a billboard, with a picture of chihuahua wearing pearls and the words "Your closet's so shallow it makes Paris [Hilton] look deep", attracted a cease and desist letter from Hilton's lawyer. In 2014, representatives of start-up storage company MakeSpace, which advertises "cloud storage," criticized Manhattan Mini Storage for having an advertisement that read "Don't trust the cloud." A Huffington Post writer commented that some of the advertisements in Manhattan Mini Storage's 2015 campaign, which featured "a transgender woman, or male drag queen, [posing] by a vanity with furs and wigs surrounding," could be potentially taken out of context.

Community outreach 
Manhattan Mini Storage has sponsored community groups such as: PrideNYC, Friends of Hudson River, Medieval Festival, Project Back to School, Friends of Carl Shurz Park, NYLaughs, Furnish a Future, Aids Walk, NY Class, I Care, Score!, NY Dream Center, Animal Haven, NY Classical Theater, and The Diabetes Research Institute.

Manhattan Mini Storage Sister Companies 
 WorkSpace Offices
 StorageMart

References

External links 
 

Companies based in Newark, New Jersey
Storage companies